Antinephele anomala is a moth of the family Sphingidae. It was described by Arthur Gardiner Butler in 1882 and is known from Ivory Coast and Nigeria. It is considered most similar to Antinephele achlora.

References

Antinephele
Moths described in 1882
Moths of Africa